The Rose Of Kingston Stakes, is a Victoria Racing Club Group 2 Thoroughbred horse race, for mares four years old and older, with set weights with penalties conditions, over a distance of 1400 metres, held annually at Flemington Racecourse in Melbourne, Australia in early October.  Total prize money for the race is A$300,000.

History
The registered race is named for the 1981–82 Australian Champion Racehorse of the Year Rose of Kingston.

Name
 1989–1993 - Honda Prelude Stakes
 1994–1997 - The Hardy Bros Prelude 
 1998 - The Blazer Menswear Stakes
 1999 - The Gillette Stakes
 2000–2005 - The Jayco Stakes
 2006 - Melbourne Cup Carnival Preview Stakes
 2007 - U C I Stakes
 2008 - Blazer Stakes
 2009 - Rose Of Kingston Stakes
 2010–2019 - Blazer Stakes
 2020 onwards - Rose of Kingston Stakes

Distance
 1989–1996 - 1400 metres
 1997–1999 - 1417 metres
 2000 - 1412 metres
 2001–2002 - 1420 metres
 2003–2009 - 1410 metres
 2010–2011 - 1400 metres
 2012–2013 - 1410 metres
 2014 onwards - 1400 metres

Grade
 1990–1996 - Listed Race
 1997–2004 - Group 3 race
 2005 onwards - Group 2 race

Winners

 2022 - Excelida
 2021 - Still A Star
 2020 - Sierra Sue
 2019 - Haut Brion Her
 2018 - Invincibella
 2017 - Now Or Later
 2016 -  French Emotion
 2015 - La Passe
 2014 - Forever Loved
 2013 - Fire Up Fifi
 2012 - Mosheen
 2011 - Lady Lynette
 2010 - Palacio De Cristal
 2009 - Cats Whisker
 2008 - Bellini Rose
 2007 - Vormista
 2006 - Divine Madonna
 2005 - Sky Cuddle
 2004 - Skewiff
 2003 - Vocabulary
 2002 - Hosannah
 2001 - Tickle My
 2000 - Ramano's Star
 1999 - Hula Wonder
 1998 - Our Dynamic Lady
 1997 - Will Fly
 1996 - Chlorophyll
 1995 - Tolanda
 1994 - Sedately
 1993 - Excited Angel
 1992 - Danjiki
 1991 - Holiday Lover
 1990 - Piper's Belle
 1989 - Lady Jess

See also
 List of Australian Group races
 Group races

References

Horse races in Australia